The 2020 NWSL Challenge Cup Championship was a soccer match held on July 26, 2020, at the Rio Tinto Stadium in Sandy, Utah. It was the final match of the 2020 NWSL Challenge Cup, a one-off competition marking the resumption of the 2020 National Women's Soccer League season following the initial wave of the COVID-19 pandemic. The match was played behind closed doors due to the pandemic and was broadcast on CBS beginning at 12:30 ET.

Houston Dash won the match 2–0 against Chicago Red Stars to win the tournament.

Road to the final

The 2020 NWSL Challenge Cup was a one-off tournament during the 2020 NWSL season to mark the league's return to action from the COVID-19 pandemic. Eight National Women's Soccer League teams participated in the tournament. The tournament, played behind closed doors in the Salt Lake City area, began on June 27 with a preliminary round, followed by a knockout round.

Note: In all results below, the score of the finalist is given first.

Match

Details

Broadcasting
The match aired on CBS and CBS All Access in the United States and Canada, and on Twitch internationally. Jenn Hildreth and Lori Lindsey served as play-by-play announcer and analyst respectively on CBS, while Mike Watts and Jen Cooper did the same on Twitch. Marisa Pilla was the on-field reporter.

CBS Sports soccer reporter Sandra Herrera and studio host Sherree Burruss hosted the pre- and post-game shows on CBS Sports HQ along with Aly Wagner. Alex Morgan also joined the pregame show.

Notes

References

External links 
 

2020
2020 in American soccer leagues
2020 National Women's Soccer League season
NWSL
NWSL Challenge
NWSL